This is a list of the bird species recorded in Laos. The avifauna of Laos include a total of 776 species, of which two have been introduced by humans.

This list's taxonomic treatment (designation and sequence of orders, families and species) and nomenclature (common and scientific names) follow the conventions of The Clements Checklist of Birds of the World, 2022 edition. The family accounts at the beginning of each heading reflect this taxonomy, as do the species counts found in each family account. Introduced and accidental species are included in the total counts for Laos.

The following tags have been used to highlight several categories, but not all species fall into one of these categories. Those that do not are commonly occurring native species.

(A) Accidental - a species that rarely or accidentally occurs in Laos
(E) Endemic - a species endemic to Laos
(I) Introduced - a species introduced to Laos as a consequence, direct or indirect, of human actions

Ducks, geese, and waterfowl
Order: AnseriformesFamily: Anatidae

Anatidae includes the ducks and most duck-like waterfowl, such as geese and swans. These birds are adapted to an aquatic existence with webbed feet, flattened bills, and feathers that are excellent at shedding water due to an oily coating.

Lesser whistling-duck, Dendrocygna javanica
Bar-headed goose, Anser indicus
Graylag goose, Anser anser
Swan goose, Anser cygnoides
Knob-billed duck, Sarkidiornis melanotos
Ruddy shelduck, Tadorna ferruginea
Common shelduck, Tadorna tadorna
Cotton pygmy-goose, Nettapus coromandelianus
Mandarin duck, Aix galericulata (A)
Garganey, Spatula querquedula
Falcated duck, Mareca falcata
Eurasian wigeon, Mareca penelope
Indian spot-billed duck, Anas poecilorhyncha
Eastern spot-billed duck, Anas zonorhyncha
Northern pintail, Anas acuta
Green-winged teal, Anas crecca
White-winged duck, Asarcornis scutulata
Ferruginous duck, Aythya nyroca (A)
Baer's pochard, Aythya baeri (A)

Pheasants, grouse, and allies
Order: GalliformesFamily: Phasianidae

The Phasianidae are a family of terrestrial birds which consists of quails, partridges, snowcocks, francolins, spurfowls, tragopans, monals, pheasants, peafowls and jungle fowls. In general, they are plump (although they vary in size) and have broad, relatively short wings.

Rufous-throated partridge, Arborophila rufogularis
Bar-backed partridge, Arborophila brunneopectus
Silver pheasant, Lophura nycthemera
Siamese fireback, Lophura diardi
Vietnamese crested argus, Rheinardia ocellata
Green peafowl, Pavo muticus (A)
Scaly-breasted partridge, Tropicoperdix chloropus
Gray peacock-pheasant, Polyplectron bicalcaratum
Mountain bamboo-partridge, Bambusicola fytchii
Red junglefowl, Gallus gallus
Chinese francolin, Francolinus pintadeanus
Blue-breasted quail, Synoicus chinensis
Japanese quail, Coturnix japonica

Grebes
Order: PodicipediformesFamily: Podicipedidae

Grebes are small to medium-large freshwater diving birds. They have lobed toes and are excellent swimmers and divers. However, they have their feet placed far back on the body, making them quite ungainly on land.

Little grebe, Tachybaptus ruficollis

Pigeons and doves
Order: ColumbiformesFamily: Columbidae

Pigeons and doves are stout-bodied birds with short necks and short slender bills with a fleshy cere.

Rock pigeon, Columba livia
Speckled wood-pigeon, Columba hodgsonii
Ashy wood-pigeon, Columba pulchricollis (A)
Pale-capped pigeon, Columba punicea
Oriental turtle-dove, Streptopelia orientalis
Eurasian collared-dove, Streptopelia decaocto (A)
Red collared-dove, Streptopelia tranquebarica
Spotted dove, Streptopelia chinensis
Barred cuckoo-dove, Macropygia unchall
Little cuckoo-dove, Macropygia ruficeps
Asian emerald dove, Chalcophaps indica
Zebra dove, Geopelia striata (I)
Orange-breasted green-pigeon, Treron bicincta
Ashy-headed green-pigeon, Treron phayrei
Thick-billed green-pigeon, Treron curvirostra
Yellow-footed green-pigeon, Treron phoenicoptera
Yellow-vented green-pigeon, Treron seimundi
Pin-tailed green-pigeon, Treron apicauda
Wedge-tailed green-pigeon, Treron sphenura
White-bellied green-pigeon, Treron sieboldii
Green imperial-pigeon, Ducula aenea
Mountain imperial-pigeon, Ducula badia

Cuckoos
Order: CuculiformesFamily: Cuculidae

The family Cuculidae includes cuckoos, roadrunners and anis. These birds are of variable size with slender bodies, long tails and strong legs. The Old World cuckoos are brood parasites.

Coral-billed ground-cuckoo, Carpococcyx renauldi
Greater coucal, Centropus sinensis
Lesser coucal, Centropus bengalensis
Green-billed malkoha, Phaenicophaeus tristis
Chestnut-winged cuckoo, Clamator coromandus
Asian koel, Eudynamys scolopacea
Asian emerald cuckoo, Chrysococcyx maculatus
Violet cuckoo, Chrysococcyx xanthorhynchus'
Banded bay cuckoo, Cacomantis sonneratiiPlaintive cuckoo, Cacomantis merulinusSquare-tailed drongo-cuckoo, Surniculus lugubris
Moustached hawk-cuckoo, Hierococcyx vagans (A)
Large hawk-cuckoo, Hierococcyx sparverioides
Northern hawk-cuckoo, Hierococcyx hyperythrus
Hodgson's hawk-cuckoo, Hierococcyx nisicolor
Lesser cuckoo, Cuculus poliocephalus
Indian cuckoo, Cuculus micropterus
Himalayan cuckoo, Cuculus saturatus
Common cuckoo, Cuculus canorus

FrogmouthsOrder: CaprimulgiformesFamily: Podargidae

The frogmouths are a group of nocturnal birds related to the nightjars. They are named for their large flattened hooked bill and huge frog-like gape, which they use to take insects.

Hodgson's frogmouth, Batrachostomus hodgsoni
Blyth's frogmouth, Batrachostomus affinis

Nightjars and alliesOrder: CaprimulgiformesFamily: Caprimulgidae

Nightjars are medium-sized nocturnal birds that usually nest on the ground. They have long wings, short legs and very short bills. Most have small feet, of little use for walking, and long pointed wings. Their soft plumage is camouflaged to resemble bark or leaves.

Great eared-nightjar, Lyncornis macrotis
Gray nightjar, Caprimulgus jotaka
Large-tailed nightjar, Caprimulgus macrurus
Indian nightjar, Caprimulgus asiaticus
Savanna nightjar, Caprimulgus affinis

SwiftsOrder: CaprimulgiformesFamily: Apodidae

Swifts are small birds which spend the majority of their lives flying. These birds have very short legs and never settle voluntarily on the ground, perching instead only on vertical surfaces. Many swifts have long swept-back wings which resemble a crescent or boomerang.

White-throated needletail, Hirundapus caudacutus
Silver-backed needletail, Hirundapus cochinchinensis
Brown-backed needletail, Hirundapus giganteus
Himalayan swiftlet, Aerodramus brevirostris
White-nest swiftlet, Aerodramus fuciphagus
Germain's swiftlet, Aerodramus germani
Pacific swift, Apus pacificus
Cook's swift, Apus cooki
House swift, Apus nipalensis
Asian palm-swift, Cypsiurus balasiensis

TreeswiftsOrder: CaprimulgiformesFamily: Hemiprocnidae

The treeswifts, also called crested swifts, are closely related to the true swifts. They differ from the other swifts in that they have crests, long forked tails and softer plumage.

Crested treeswift, Hemiprocne coronata

Rails, gallinules, and cootsOrder: GruiformesFamily: Rallidae

Rallidae is a large family of small to medium-sized birds which includes the rails, crakes, coots and gallinules. Typically they inhabit dense vegetation in damp environments near lakes, swamps or rivers. In general they are shy and secretive birds, making them difficult to observe. Most species have strong legs and long toes which are well adapted to soft uneven surfaces. They tend to have short, rounded wings and to be weak fliers.

Brown-cheeked rail, Rallus indicus (A)
Slaty-breasted rail, Lewinia striata
Eurasian moorhen, Gallinula chloropus
Eurasian coot, Fulica atra
Gray-headed swamphen, Porphyrio poliocephalus
White-browed crake, Poliolimnas cinereus (A)
Watercock, Gallicrex cinerea
White-breasted waterhen, Amaurornis phoenicurus
Red-legged crake, Rallina fasciata
Slaty-legged crake, Rallina eurizonoides
Ruddy-breasted crake, Zapornia fusca
Baillon's crake, Zapornia pusilla
Black-tailed crake, Zapornia bicolor

FinfootsOrder: GruiformesFamily: Heliornithidae

Heliornithidae is a small family of tropical birds with webbed lobes on their feet similar to those of grebes and coots.

Masked finfoot, Heliopais personata

CranesOrder: GruiformesFamily: Gruidae

Cranes are large, long-legged and long-necked birds. Unlike the similar-looking but unrelated herons, cranes fly with necks outstretched, not pulled back. Most have elaborate and noisy courting displays or "dances".

Sarus crane, Antigone antigone

Thick-kneesOrder: CharadriiformesFamily: Burhinidae

The thick-knees are a group of largely tropical waders in the family Burhinidae. They are found worldwide within the tropical zone, with some species also breeding in temperate Europe and Australia. They are medium to large waders with strong black or yellow-black bills, large yellow eyes and cryptic plumage. Despite being classed as waders, most species have a preference for arid or semi-arid habitats.

Indian thick-knee, Burhinus indicus (A)
Great thick-knee, Esacus recurvirostris (A)

Stilts and avocetsOrder: CharadriiformesFamily: Recurvirostridae

Recurvirostridae is a family of large wading birds, which includes the avocets and stilts. The avocets have long legs and long up-curved bills. The stilts have extremely long legs and long, thin, straight bills.

Black-winged stilt, Himantopus himantopus

Plovers and lapwingsOrder: CharadriiformesFamily: Charadriidae

The family Charadriidae includes the plovers, dotterels and lapwings. They are small to medium-sized birds with compact bodies, short, thick necks and long, usually pointed, wings. They are found in open country worldwide, mostly in habitats near water.

Black-bellied plover, Pluvialis squatarola (A)
Pacific golden-plover, Pluvialis fulva
Northern lapwing, Vanellus vanellus
River lapwing, Vanellus duvaucelii (A)
Gray-headed lapwing, Vanellus cinereus
Red-wattled lapwing, Vanellus indicus (A)
Lesser sand-plover, Charadrius mongolus (A)
Greater sand-plover, Charadrius leschenaultii (A)
Kentish plover, Charadrius alexandrinus
White-faced plover, Charadrius dealbatus
Common ringed plover, Charadrius hiaticula (A)
Long-billed plover, Charadrius placidus
Little ringed plover, Charadrius dubius
Oriental plover, Charadrius veredus (A)

Painted-snipesOrder: CharadriiformesFamily: Rostratulidae

Painted-snipes are short-legged, long-billed birds similar in shape to the true snipes, but more brightly coloured.

Greater painted-snipe, Rostratula benghalensis

JacanasOrder: CharadriiformesFamily: Jacanidae

The jacanas are a group of tropical waders in the family Jacanidae. They are found throughout the tropics. They are identifiable by their huge feet and claws which enable them to walk on floating vegetation in the shallow lakes that are their preferred habitat.

Pheasant-tailed jacana, Hydrophasianus chirurgus
Bronze-winged jacana, Metopidius indicus

Sandpipers and alliesOrder: CharadriiformesFamily: Scolopacidae

Scolopacidae is a large diverse family of small to medium-sized shorebirds including the sandpipers, curlews, godwits, shanks, tattlers, woodcocks, snipes, dowitchers and phalaropes. The majority of these species eat small invertebrates picked out of the mud or soil. Variation in length of legs and bills enables multiple species to feed in the same habitat, particularly on the coast, without direct competition for food.

Whimbrel, Numenius phaeopus (A)
Eurasian curlew, Numenius arquata (A)
Black-tailed godwit, Limosa limosa (A)
Ruddy turnstone, Arenaria interpres (A)
Ruff, Calidris pugnax
Curlew sandpiper, Calidris ferruginea (A)
Temminck's stint, Calidris temminckii
Long-toed stint, Calidris subminuta
Red-necked stint, Calidris ruficollis (A)
Sanderling, Calidris alba (A)
Dunlin, Calidris alpina
Eurasian woodcock, Scolopax rusticola
Wood snipe, Gallinago nemoricola (A)
Common snipe, Gallinago gallinago
Pin-tailed snipe, Gallinago stenura
Swinhoe's snipe, Gallinago megala (A)
Terek sandpiper, Xenus cinereus
Red-necked phalarope, Phalaropus lobatus (A)
Common sandpiper, Actitis hypoleucos
Green sandpiper, Tringa ochropus
Gray-tailed tattler, Tringa brevipes (A)
Spotted redshank, Tringa erythropus
Common greenshank, Tringa nebularia
Nordmann's greenshank, Tringa guttifer
Marsh sandpiper, Tringa stagnatilis (A)
Wood sandpiper, Tringa glareola
Common redshank, Tringa totanus

ButtonquailOrder: CharadriiformesFamily: Turnicidae

The buttonquail are small, drab, running birds which resemble the true quails. The female is the brighter of the sexes and initiates courtship. The male incubates the eggs and tends the young.

Small buttonquail, Turnix sylvatica
Yellow-legged buttonquail, Turnix tanki
Barred buttonquail, Turnix suscitator

Pratincoles and coursersOrder: CharadriiformesFamily: Glareolidae

Glareolidae is a family of wading birds comprising the pratincoles, which have short legs, long pointed wings and long forked tails, and the coursers, which have long legs, short wings and long, pointed bills which curve downwards.

Oriental pratincole, Glareola maldivarum
Small pratincole, Glareola lactea

Gulls, terns, and skimmersOrder: CharadriiformesFamily: Laridae

Laridae is a family of medium to large seabirds, the gulls, terns, and skimmers. Gulls are typically grey or white, often with black markings on the head or wings. They have stout, longish bills and webbed feet. Terns are a group of generally medium to large seabirds typically with grey or white plumage, often with black markings on the head. Most terns hunt fish by diving but some pick insects off the surface of fresh water. Terns are generally long-lived birds, with several species known to live in excess of 30 years. Skimmers are a small family of tropical tern-like birds. They have an elongated lower mandible which they use to feed by flying low over the water surface and skimming the water for small fish.

Black-headed gull, Chroicocephalus ridibundus (A)
Brown-headed gull, Chroicocephalus brunnicephalus
Pallas's gull, Ichthyaetus ichthyaetus
Herring gull, Larus argentatus (A)
Lesser black-backed gull, Larus fuscus (A)
Little tern, Sternula albifrons
White-winged tern, Chlidonias leucopterus
Whiskered tern, Chlidonias hybrida (A)
Black-bellied tern, Sterna acuticauda (Ex)
River tern, Sterna aurantia (A)
Great crested tern, Thalasseus bergii
Indian skimmer, Rynchops albicollis

StorksOrder: CiconiiformesFamily: Ciconiidae

Storks are large, long-legged, long-necked, wading birds with long, stout bills. Storks are mute, but bill-clattering is an important mode of communication at the nest. Their nests can be large and may be reused for many years. Many species are migratory.

Asian openbill, Anastomus oscitans
Black stork, Ciconia nigra
Asian woolly-necked stork, Ciconia episcopus
Black-necked stork, Ephippiorhynchus asiaticus
Lesser adjutant, Leptoptilos javanicus
Greater adjutant, Leptoptilos dubius
Painted stork, Mycteria leucocephala

FrigatebirdsOrder: SuliformesFamily: Fregatidae

Frigatebirds are large seabirds usually found over tropical oceans. They are large, black-and-white or completely black, with long wings and deeply forked tails. The males have colored inflatable throat pouches. They do not swim or walk and cannot take off from a flat surface. Having the largest wingspan-to-body-weight ratio of any bird, they are essentially aerial, able to stay aloft for more than a week.

Lesser frigatebird, Fregata ariel (A)

AnhingasOrder: SuliformesFamily: Anhingidae

Anhingas or darters are often called "snake-birds" because of their long thin neck, which gives a snake-like appearance when they swim with their bodies submerged. The males have black and dark-brown plumage, an erectile crest on the nape and a larger bill than the female. The females have much paler plumage especially on the neck and underparts. The darters have completely webbed feet and their legs are short and set far back on the body. Their plumage is somewhat permeable, like that of cormorants, and they spread their wings to dry after diving.

Oriental darter, Anhinga melanogaster (A)

Cormorants and shagsOrder: SuliformesFamily: Phalacrocoracidae

Phalacrocoracidae is a family of medium to large coastal, fish-eating seabirds which includes cormorants and shags. Plumage colouration varies, with the majority having mainly dark plumage, some species being black-and-white and a few being colourful.

Little cormorant, Microcarbo niger
Great cormorant, Phalacrocorax carbo (A)
Indian cormorant, Phalacrocorax fuscicollis

PelicansOrder: PelecaniformesFamily: Pelecanidae

Pelicans are large water birds with a distinctive pouch under their beak. As with other members of the order Pelecaniformes, they have webbed feet with four toes.

Spot-billed pelican, Pelecanus philippensis

Herons, egrets, and bitternsOrder: PelecaniformesFamily: Ardeidae

The family Ardeidae contains the bitterns, herons, and egrets. Herons and egrets are medium to large wading birds with long necks and legs. Bitterns tend to be shorter necked and more wary. Members of Ardeidae fly with their necks retracted, unlike other long-necked birds such as storks, ibises and spoonbills.

Great bittern, Botaurus stellaris (A)
Yellow bittern, Ixobrychus sinensis
Schrenck's bittern, Ixobrychus eurhythmus
Cinnamon bittern, Ixobrychus cinnamomeus
Black bittern, Ixobrychus flavicollis
Gray heron, Ardea cinerea
Purple heron, Ardea purpurea
Great egret, Ardea alba
Intermediate egret, Ardea intermedia
Little egret, Egretta garzetta
Cattle egret, Bubulcus ibis
Chinese pond-heron, Ardeola bacchus
Javan pond-heron, Ardeola speciosa (A)
Striated heron, Butorides striata
Black-crowned night-heron, Nycticorax nycticorax
Malayan night-heron, Gorsachius melanolophus

Ibises and spoonbillsOrder: PelecaniformesFamily: Threskiornithidae

Threskiornithidae is a family of large terrestrial and wading birds which includes the ibises and spoonbills. They have long, broad wings with 11 primary and about 20 secondary feathers. They are strong fliers and despite their size and weight, very capable soarers.

Glossy ibis, Plegadis falcinellus (A)
Black-headed ibis, Threskiornis melanocephalus
White-shouldered ibis, Pseudibis davisoni
Giant ibis, Pseudibis gigantea

OspreyOrder: AccipitriformesFamily: Pandionidae

The family Pandionidae contains only one species, the osprey. The osprey is a medium-large raptor which is a specialist fish-eater with a worldwide distribution.

Osprey, Pandion haliaetus

Hawks, eagles, and kitesOrder: AccipitriformesFamily: Accipitridae

Accipitridae is a family of birds of prey, which includes hawks, eagles, kites, harriers and Old World vultures. These birds have powerful hooked beaks for tearing flesh from their prey, strong legs, powerful talons and keen eyesight.

Black-winged kite, Elanus caeruleus
Oriental honey-buzzard, Pernis ptilorhynchus
Jerdon's baza, Aviceda jerdoni
Black baza, Aviceda leuphotes
Red-headed vulture, Sarcogyps calvus
Cinereous vulture, Aegypius monachus (A)
White-rumped vulture, Gyps bengalensis (possibly extirpated)
Slender-billed vulture, Gyps tenuirostris
Crested serpent-eagle, Spilornis cheela
Short-toed snake-eagle, Circaetus gallicus (A)
Changeable hawk-eagle, Nisaetus cirrhatus
Mountain hawk-eagle, Nisaetus nipalensis
Rufous-bellied eagle, Lophotriorchis kienerii
Black eagle, Ictinaetus malaiensis
Greater spotted eagle, Clanga clanga
Booted eagle, Hieraaetus pennatus (A)
Imperial eagle, Aquila heliaca
Bonelli's eagle, Aquila fasciata
Rufous-winged buzzard, Butastur liventer
Gray-faced buzzard, Butastur indicus
Eurasian marsh-harrier, Circus aeruginosus (A)
Eastern marsh-harrier, Circus spilonotus
Hen harrier, Circus cyaneus (A)
Pied harrier, Circus melanoleucos
Crested goshawk, Accipiter trivirgatus
Shikra, Accipiter badius
Chinese sparrowhawk, Accipiter soloensis
Japanese sparrowhawk, Accipiter gularis
Besra, Accipiter virgatus
Eurasian sparrowhawk, Accipiter nisus
Black kite, Milvus migrans
Brahminy kite, Haliastur indus (A)
White-bellied sea-eagle, Haliaeetus leucogaster
Lesser fish-eagle, Haliaeetus humilis
Gray-headed fish-eagle, 	Haliaeetus ichthyaetus
Common buzzard, Buteo buteo
Eastern buzzard, Buteo japonicus

Barn-owlsOrder: StrigiformesFamily: Tytonidae

Barn-owls are medium to large owls with large heads and characteristic heart-shaped faces. They have long strong legs with powerful talons.

Barn owl, Tyto alba
Oriental bay-owl, Phodilus badius

OwlsOrder: StrigiformesFamily': Strigidae

The typical owls are small to large solitary nocturnal birds of prey. They have large forward-facing eyes and ears, a hawk-like beak and a conspicuous circle of feathers around each eye called a facial disk.

Mountain scops-owl, Otus spilocephalusCollared scops-owl, Otus lettiaOriental scops-owl, Otus suniaSpot-bellied eagle-owl, Bubo nipalensisBrown fish-owl, Ketupa zeylonensisTawny fish-owl, Ketupa flavipesBuffy fish-owl, Ketupa ketupuAsian barred owlet, Glaucidium cuculoides
Collared owlet, Taenioptynx brodiei'
Spotted owlet, Athene bramaSpotted wood-owl, Strix seloputo (A)
Brown wood-owl, Strix leptogrammicaHimalayan owl, Strix nivicolumLong-eared owl, Asio otusShort-eared owl, Asio flammeusBrown boobook, Ninox scutulataTrogons
Order: TrogoniformesFamily: Trogonidae

The family Trogonidae includes trogons and quetzals. Found in tropical woodlands worldwide, they feed on insects and fruit, and their broad bills and weak legs reflect their diet and arboreal habits. Although their flight is fast, they are reluctant to fly any distance. Trogons have soft, often colourful, feathers with distinctive male and female plumage.

Red-headed trogon, Harpactes erythrocephalusOrange-breasted trogon, Harpactes oreskiosHoopoes
Order: BucerotiformesFamily: Upupidae

Hoopoes have black, white and orangey-pink colouring with a large erectile crest on their head.

Eurasian hoopoe, Upupa epopsHornbills
Order: BucerotiformesFamily: Bucerotidae

Hornbills are a group of birds whose bill is shaped like a cow's horn, but without a twist, sometimes with a casque on the upper mandible. Frequently, the bill is brightly coloured.

Great hornbill, Buceros bicornisBrown hornbill, Anorrhinus austeniOriental pied-hornbill, Anthracoceros albirostrisRufous-necked hornbill, Aceros nipalensisWreathed hornbill, Rhyticeros undulatusKingfishers
Order: CoraciiformesFamily: Alcedinidae

Kingfishers are medium-sized birds with large heads, long, pointed bills, short legs and stubby tails.

Blyth's kingfisher, Alcedo herculesCommon kingfisher, Alcedo atthisBlue-eared kingfisher, Alcedo menintingBlack-backed dwarf-kingfisher, Ceyx erithacusBanded kingfisher, Lacedo pulchellaStork-billed kingfisher, Pelargopsis capensisRuddy kingfisher, Halcyon coromandaWhite-throated kingfisher, Halcyon smyrnensisBlack-capped kingfisher, Halcyon pileataCollared kingfisher, Todirhamphus chlorisCrested kingfisher, Megaceryle lugubrisPied kingfisher, Ceryle rudisBee-eaters
Order: CoraciiformesFamily: Meropidae

The bee-eaters are a group of near passerine birds in the family Meropidae. Most species are found in Africa but others occur in southern Europe, Madagascar, Australia and New Guinea. They are characterised by richly coloured plumage, slender bodies and usually elongated central tail feathers. All are colourful and have long downturned bills and pointed wings, which give them a swallow-like appearance when seen from afar.

Blue-bearded bee-eater, Nyctyornis athertoniAsian green bee-eater, Merops orientalisBlue-throated bee-eater, Merops viridisBlue-tailed bee-eater, Merops philippinusChestnut-headed bee-eater, Merops leschenaultiRollers
Order: CoraciiformesFamily: Coraciidae

Rollers resemble crows in size and build, but are more closely related to the kingfishers and bee-eaters. They share the colourful appearance of those groups with blues and browns predominating. The two inner front toes are connected, but the outer toe is not.

Indochinese roller, Coracias affinisDollarbird, Eurystomus orientalisAsian barbets
Order: PiciformesFamily: Megalaimidae

The Asian barbets are plump birds, with short necks and large heads. They get their name from the bristles which fringe their heavy bills. Most species are brightly coloured.

Coppersmith barbet, Psilopogon haemacephalusBlue-eared barbet, Psilopogon duvauceliiGreat barbet, Psilopogon virensRed-vented barbet, Psilopogon lagrandieriGreen-eared barbet, Psilopogon faiostrictusLineated barbet, Psilopogon lineatusGolden-throated barbet, Psilopogon frankliniiNecklaced barbet, Psilopogon auricularisMoustached barbet, Psilopogon incognitusBlue-throated barbet, Psilopogon asiaticusIndochinese barbet, Psilopogon annamensisWoodpeckers
Order: PiciformesFamily: Picidae

Woodpeckers are small to medium-sized birds with chisel-like beaks, short legs, stiff tails and long tongues used for capturing insects. Some species have feet with two toes pointing forward and two backward, while several species have only three toes. Many woodpeckers have the habit of tapping noisily on tree trunks with their beaks.

Eurasian wryneck, Jynx torquilla (A)
Speckled piculet, Picumnus innominatusWhite-browed piculet, Sasia ochraceaHeart-spotted woodpecker, Hemicircus canenteGray-capped pygmy woodpecker, Yungipicus canicapillusYellow-crowned woodpecker, Leiopicus mahrattensisFreckle-breasted woodpecker, Dendrocopos analisStripe-breasted woodpecker, Dendrocopos atratusGreat spotted woodpecker, Dendrocopos majorCrimson-breasted woodpecker, Dryobates cathphariusBay woodpecker, Blythipicus pyrrhotisGreater flameback, Chrysocolaptes guttacristatusRufous woodpecker, Micropternus brachyurusBlack-and-buff woodpecker, Meiglyptes jugularisPale-headed woodpecker, Gecinulus grantiaBamboo woodpecker, Gecinulus viridisCommon flameback, Dinopium javanenseLesser yellownape, Picus chlorolophusStreak-throated woodpecker, Picus xanthopygaeusRed-collared woodpecker, Picus rabieriLaced woodpecker, Picus vittatusGray-headed woodpecker, Picus canusBlack-headed woodpecker, Picus erythropygiusGreater yellownape, Chrysophlegma flavinuchaGreat slaty woodpecker, Mulleripicus pulverulentusWhite-bellied woodpecker, Dryocopus javensisFalcons and caracaras
Order: FalconiformesFamily: Falconidae

Falconidae is a family of diurnal birds of prey. They differ from hawks, eagles and kites in that they kill with their beaks instead of their talons. T

White-rumped falcon, Polihierax insignisCollared falconet, Microhierax caerulescensPied falconet, Microhierax melanoleucusLesser kestrel, Falco naumanni (extirpated)
Eurasian kestrel, Falco tinnunculusAmur falcon, Falco amurensisMerlin, Falco columbariusEurasian hobby, Falco subbuteoOriental hobby, Falco severusPeregrine falcon, Falco peregrinusOld World parrots
Order: PsittaciformesFamily: Psittaculidae

Parrots are small to large birds with a characteristic curved beak. Their upper mandibles have slight mobility in the joint with the skull and they have a generally erect stance. All parrots are zygodactyl, having the four toes on each foot placed two at the front and two to the back.

Alexandrine parakeet, Psittacula eupatriaGray-headed parakeet, Psittacula finschiiBlossom-headed parakeet, Psittacula roseataRed-breasted parakeet, Psittacula alexandriVernal hanging-parrot, Loriculus vernalisAsian and Grauer’s broadbills
Order: PasseriformesFamily: Eurylaimidae

The broadbills are small, brightly coloured birds, which feed on fruit and also take insects in flycatcher fashion, snapping their broad bills. Their habitat is canopies of wet forests.

Black-and-red broadbill, Cymbirhynchus macrorhynchosLong-tailed broadbill, Psarisomus dalhousiaeSilver-breasted broadbill, Serilophus lunatusBanded broadbill, Eurylaimus javanicusDusky broadbill, Corydon sumatranusPittas
Order: PasseriformesFamily: Pittidae

Pittas are medium-sized by passerine standards and are stocky, with fairly long, strong legs, short tails and stout bills. Many are brightly coloured. They spend the majority of their time on wet forest floors, eating snails, insects and similar invertebrates.

Eared pitta, Hydrornis phayreiRusty-naped pitta, Hydrornis oatesiBlue-naped pitta, Hydrornis nipalensisBlue-rumped pitta, Hydrornis sororBlue pitta, Hydrornis cyaneaBar-bellied pitta, Hydrornis elliotiiBlue-winged pitta, Pitta moluccensisFairy pitta, Pitta nymphaHooded pitta, Pitta sordidaCuckooshrikes
Order: PasseriformesFamily: Campephagidae

The cuckooshrikes are small to medium-sized passerine birds. They are predominantly greyish with white and black, although some species are brightly coloured.

Small minivet, Pericrocotus cinnamomeusGray-chinned minivet, Pericrocotus solarisShort-billed minivet, Pericrocotus brevirostrisLong-tailed minivet, Pericrocotus ethologusScarlet minivet, Pericrocotus flammeusAshy minivet, Pericrocotus divaricatusBrown-rumped minivet, Pericrocotus cantonensisRosy minivet, Pericrocotus roseusLarge cuckooshrike, Coracina maceiBlack-winged cuckooshrike, Lalage melaschistosIndochinese cuckooshrike, Lalage poliopteraVireos, shrike-babblers, and erpornis
Order: PasseriformesFamily: Vireonidae

Most of the members of this family are found in the New World. However, the shrike-babblers and erpornis, which only slightly resemble the "true" vireos and greenlets, are found in South East Asia.

White-browed shrike-babbler, Pteruthius aeralatusBlack-eared shrike-babbler, Pteruthius melanotisClicking shrike-babbler, Pteruthius intermediusWhite-bellied erpornis, Erpornis zantholeucaWhistlers and allies
Order: PasseriformesFamily: Pachycephalidae

The family Pachycephalidae includes the whistlers, shrikethrushes, and some of the pitohuis.

Mangrove whistler, Pachycephala cinereaOld World orioles
Order: PasseriformesFamily: Oriolidae

The Old World orioles are colourful passerine birds. They are not related to the New World orioles.

Black-naped oriole, Oriolus chinensisSlender-billed oriole, Oriolus tenuirostrisBlack-hooded oriole, Oriolus xanthornusMaroon oriole, Oriolus trailliiWoodswallows, bellmagpies, and allies
Order: PasseriformesFamily: Artamidae

The woodswallows are soft-plumaged, somber-coloured passerine birds. They are smooth, agile flyers with moderately large, semi-triangular wings.

Ashy woodswallow, Artamus fuscusVangas, helmetshrikes, and allies
Order: PasseriformesFamily: Vangidae

The family Vangidae is highly variable, though most members of it resemble true shrikes to some degree.

Large woodshrike, Tephrodornis gularisCommon woodshrike, Tephrodornis pondicerianusBar-winged flycatcher-shrike, Hemipus picatusIoras
Order: PasseriformesFamily: Aegithinidae

The ioras are bulbul-like birds of open forest or thorn scrub, but whereas that group tends to be drab in colouration, ioras are sexually dimorphic, with the males being brightly plumaged in yellows and greens.

Common iora, Aegithina tiphiaGreat iora, Aegithina lafresnayeiFantails
Order: PasseriformesFamily: Rhipiduridae

The fantails are small insectivorous birds which are specialist aerial feeders.

Malaysian pied-fantail, Rhipidura javanicaWhite-throated fantail, Rhipidura albicollisWhite-browed fantail, Rhipidura aureolaDrongos
Order: PasseriformesFamily: Dicruridae

The drongos are mostly black or dark grey in colour, sometimes with metallic tints. They have long forked tails, and some Asian species have elaborate tail decorations. They have short legs and sit very upright when perched, like a shrike. They flycatch or take prey from the ground.

Black drongo, Dicrurus macrocercusAshy drongo, Dicrurus leucophaeusCrow-billed drongo, Dicrurus annectensBronzed drongo, Dicrurus aeneusLesser racket-tailed drongo, Dicrurus remiferHair-crested drongo, Dicrurus hottentottusGreater racket-tailed drongo, Dicrurus paradiseusMonarch flycatchers
Order: PasseriformesFamily: Monarchidae

The monarch flycatchers are small to medium-sized insectivorous passerines which hunt by flycatching.

Black-naped monarch, Hypothymis azureaJapanese paradise-flycatcher, Terpsiphone atrocaudataAmur paradise-flycatcher, Terpsiphone inceiBlyth's paradise-flycatcher, Terpsiphone affinisShrikes
Order: PasseriformesFamily: Laniidae

Shrikes are passerine birds known for their habit of catching other birds and small animals and impaling the uneaten portions of their bodies on thorns. A typical shrike's beak is hooked, like a bird of prey.

Tiger shrike, Lanius tigrinusBrown shrike, Lanius cristatusBurmese shrike, Lanius collurioidesLong-tailed shrike, Lanius schachGray-backed shrike, Lanius tephronotusCrows, jays, and magpies
Order: PasseriformesFamily: Corvidae

The family Corvidae includes crows, ravens, jays, choughs, magpies, treepies, nutcrackers and ground jays. Corvids are above average in size among the Passeriformes, and some of the larger species show high levels of intelligence.

Eurasian jay, Garrulus glandariusRed-billed blue-magpie, Urocissa erythrorhynchaWhite-winged magpie, Urocissa whiteheadiCommon green-magpie, Cissa chinensisIndochinese green-magpie, Cissa hypoleucaRufous treepie, Dendrocitta vagabundaGray treepie, Dendrocitta formosaeRacket-tailed treepie, Crypsirina temiaRatchet-tailed treepie, Temnurus temnurus (A)
Oriental magpie, Pica sericaLarge-billed crow, Corvus macrorhynchosFairy flycatchers
Order: PasseriformesFamily: Stenostiridae

Most of the species of this small family are found in Africa, though a few inhabit tropical Asia. They are not closely related to other birds called "flycatchers".

Yellow-bellied fairy-fantail, Chelidorhynx hypoxanthusGray-headed canary-flycatcher, Culicicapa ceylonensisTits, chickadees, and titmice
Order: PasseriformesFamily: Paridae

The Paridae are mainly small stocky woodland species with short stout bills. Some have crests. They are adaptable birds, with a mixed diet including seeds and insects.

Fire-capped tit, Cephalopyrus flammiceps (A)
Yellow-browed tit, Sylviparus modestusSultan tit, Melanochlora sultaneaGreen-backed tit, Parus monticolusCinereous tit, Parus cinereus (A)
Japanese tit, Parus minor (A)
Yellow-cheeked tit, Machlolophus spilonotusLarks
Order: PasseriformesFamily: Alaudidae

Larks are small terrestrial birds with often extravagant songs and display flights. Most larks are fairly dull in appearance. Their food is insects and seeds.

Horsfield’s bushlark, Mirafra javanicaIndochinese bushlark, Mirafra erythrocephalaOriental skylark, Alauda gulgula (A)

Cisticolas and allies
Order: PasseriformesFamily: Cisticolidae

The Cisticolidae are warblers found mainly in warmer southern regions of the Old World. They are generally very small birds of drab brown or grey appearance found in open country such as grassland or scrub.

Common tailorbird, Orthotomus sutoriusDark-necked tailorbird, Orthotomus atrogularisStriped prinia, Prinia striata (A)
Annam prinia, Prinia rockiBrown prinia, Prinia polychroaHill prinia, Prinia superciliarisRufescent prinia, Prinia rufescensGray-breasted prinia, Prinia hodgsoniiYellow-bellied prinia, Prinia flaviventrisPlain prinia, Prinia inornataZitting cisticola, Cisticola juncidisGolden-headed cisticola, Cisticola exilisReed warblers and allies
Order: PasseriformesFamily: Acrocephalidae

The members of this family are usually rather large for "warblers". Most are rather plain olivaceous brown above with much yellow to beige below. They are usually found in open woodland, reedbeds, or tall grass. The family occurs mostly in southern to western Eurasia and surroundings, but it also ranges far into the Pacific, with some species in Africa.

Thick-billed warbler, Arundinax aedonBooted warbler, Iduna caligata (A)
Black-browed reed warbler, Acrocephalus bistrigicepsBlunt-winged warbler, Acrocephalus concinensManchurian reed warbler, Acrocephalus tangorumOriental reed warbler, Acrocephalus orientalisClamorous reed warbler, Acrocephalus stentoreusGrassbirds and allies
Order: PasseriformesFamily: Locustellidae

Locustellidae are a family of small insectivorous songbirds found mainly in Eurasia, Africa, and the Australian region. They are smallish birds with tails that are usually long and pointed, and tend to be drab brownish or buffy all over.

Striated grassbird, Megalurus palustrisPallas's grasshopper warbler, Helopsaltes certhiolaLanceolated warbler, Locustella lanceolataChinese bush warbler, Locustella tacsanowskiaBaikal bush warbler, Locustella davidiSpotted bush warbler, Locustella thoracica (A)
Russet bush warbler, Locustella mandelliCupwings
Order: PasseriformesFamily: Pnoepygidae

The members of this small family are found in mountainous parts of South and South East Asia.

Pygmy cupwing, Pnoepyga pusillaSwallows
Order: PasseriformesFamily: Hirundinidae

The family Hirundinidae is adapted to aerial feeding. They have a slender streamlined body, long pointed wings and a short bill with a wide gape. The feet are adapted to perching rather than walking, and the front toes are partially joined at the base.

Gray-throated martin, Riparia chinensisBank swallow, Riparia riparia (A)
Dusky crag-martin, Ptyonoprogne concolorBarn swallow, Hirundo rusticaWire-tailed swallow, Hirundo smithiiPacific swallow, Hirundo tahitica (A)
Red-rumped swallow, Cecropis dauricaStriated swallow, Cecropis striolataRufous-bellied swallow, Cecropis badiaCommon house-martin, Delichon urbicum (A)
Asian house-martin, Delichon dasypusNepal house-martin, Delichon nipalenseBulbuls
Order: PasseriformesFamily: Pycnonotidae

Bulbuls are medium-sized songbirds. Some are colourful with yellow, red or orange vents, cheeks, throats or supercilia, but most are drab, with uniform olive-brown to black plumage. Some species have distinct crests.

Black-headed bulbul, Brachypodius melanocephalosBlack-crested bulbul, Rubigula flaviventrisBare-faced bulbul, Nok hualon (E)
Crested finchbill, Spizixos canifronsStriated bulbul, Pycnonotus striatusRed-whiskered bulbul, Pycnonotus jocosusBrown-breasted bulbul, Pycnonotus xanthorrhousLight-vented bulbul, Pycnonotus sinensis (A)
Sooty-headed bulbul, Pycnonotus aurigasterStripe-throated bulbul, Pycnonotus finlaysoniFlavescent bulbul, Pycnonotus flavescensYellow-vented bulbul, Pycnonotus goiavierStreak-eared bulbul, Pycnonotus conradiPuff-throated bulbul, Alophoixus pallidusGray-eyed bulbul, Iole propinquaBlack bulbul, Hypsipetes leucocephalusWhite-headed bulbul, Hypsipetes thompsoni (A)
Ashy bulbul, Hemixos flavalaChestnut bulbul, Hemixos castanonotus (A)
Mountain bulbul, Ixos mcclellandiiLeaf warblers
Order: PasseriformesFamily: Phylloscopidae

Leaf warblers are a family of small insectivorous birds found mostly in Eurasia and ranging into Wallacea and Africa. The species are of various sizes, often green-plumaged above and yellow below, or more subdued with greyish-green to greyish-brown colours.

Wood warbler, Phylloscopus sibilatrix (A)
Ashy-throated warbler, Phylloscopus maculipennisBuff-barred warbler, Phylloscopus pulcherYellow-browed warbler, Phylloscopus inornatusHume's warbler, Phylloscopus humeiChinese leaf warbler, Phylloscopus yunnanensisPallas's leaf warbler, Phylloscopus proregulusGansu leaf warbler, Phylloscopus kansuensis (A)
Radde's warbler, Phylloscopus schwarziYellow-streaked warbler, Phylloscopus armandiiDusky warbler, Phylloscopus fuscatusBuff-throated warbler, Phylloscopus subaffinisEastern crowned warbler, Phylloscopus coronatusWhite-spectacled warbler, Phylloscopus intermediusGray-cheeked warbler, Phylloscopus poliogenysGray-crowned warbler, Phylloscopus tephrocephalusBianchi's warbler, Phylloscopus valentiniMartens's warbler, Phylloscopus omeiensisAlström's warbler, Phylloscopus soror (A)
Greenish warbler, Phylloscopus trochiloidesTwo-barred warbler, Phylloscopus plumbeitarsusPale-legged leaf warbler, Phylloscopus tenellipesSakhalin leaf warbler, Phylloscopus borealoides (A)
Arctic warbler, Phylloscopus borealisChestnut-crowned warbler, Phylloscopus castanicepsLimestone leaf warbler, Phylloscopus calciatilisYellow-vented warbler, Phylloscopus cantatorSulphur-breasted warbler, Phylloscopus rickettiBlyth's leaf warbler, Phylloscopus reguloidesClaudia's leaf warbler, Phylloscopus claudiaeDavison's leaf warbler, Phylloscopus intensiorKloss's leaf warbler, Phylloscopus ogilviegranti (A)

Bush warblers and allies
Order: PasseriformesFamily: Scotocercidae

The members of this family are found throughout Africa, Asia, and Polynesia. Their taxonomy is in flux, and some authorities place some genera in other families.

Pale-footed bush warbler, Urosphena pallidipesAsian stubtail, Urosphena squameicepsGray-bellied tesia, Tesia cyaniventerSlaty-bellied tesia, Tesia oliveaChestnut-headed tesia, Cettia castaneocoronataYellow-bellied warbler, Abroscopus superciliarisRufous-faced warbler, Abroscopus albogularisBlack-faced warbler, Abroscopus schisticeps (A)
Mountain tailorbird, Phyllergates cuculatusManchurian bush warbler, Horornis borealisBrownish-flanked bush warbler, Horornis fortipesAberrant bush warbler, Horornis flavolivaceusLong-tailed tits
Order: PasseriformesFamily: Aegithalidae

Long-tailed tits are a group of small passerine birds with medium to long tails. They make woven bag nests in trees. Most eat a mixed diet which includes insects.

Black-throated tit, Aegithalos concinnusSylviid warblers, parrotbills, and allies
Order: PasseriformesFamily: Sylviidae

The family Sylviidae is a group of small insectivorous passerine birds. They mainly occur as breeding species, as the common name implies, in Europe, Asia and, to a lesser extent, Africa. Most are of generally undistinguished appearance, but many have distinctive songs.

Yellow-eyed babbler, Chrysomma sinense (A)
Indochinese fulvetta, Fulvetta danisiStreak-throated fulvetta, Fulvetta manipurensisGray-headed parrotbill, Psittiparus gularisRufous-headed parrotbill, Psittiparus bakeriSpot-breasted parrotbill, Paradoxornis guttaticollisPale-billed parrotbill, Chleuasicus atrosuperciliarisBlack-throated parrotbill, Suthora nipalensisGolden parrotbill, Suthora verreauxiShort-tailed parrotbill, Neosuthora davidianusWhite-eyes, yuhinas, and allies
Order: PasseriformesFamily: Zosteropidae

The white-eyes are small and mostly undistinguished, their plumage above being generally some dull colour like greenish-olive, but some species have a white or bright yellow throat, breast or lower parts, and several have buff flanks. As their name suggests, many species have a white ring around each eye.

Indochinese yuhina, Staphida torqueolaWhiskered yuhina, Yuhina flavicollisStripe-throated yuhina, Yuhina gularisBlack-chinned yuhina, Yuhina nigrimentaChestnut-flanked white-eye, Zosterops erythropleurusIndian white-eye, Zosterops palpebrosusSwinhoe's white-eye, Zosterops simplexTree-babblers, scimitar-babblers, and allies
Order: PasseriformesFamily: Timaliidae

The babblers, or timaliids, are somewhat diverse in size and colouration, but are characterised by soft fluffy plumage.

Chestnut-capped babbler, Timalia pileataPin-striped tit-babbler, Mixornis gularisGray-faced tit-babbler, Mixornis kelleyiGolden babbler, Cyanoderma chrysaeumRufous-capped babbler, Cyanoderma ruficepsBuff-chested babbler, Cyanoderma ambiguaRufous-fronted babbler, Cyanoderma rufifronsRed-billed scimitar-babbler, Pomatorhinus ochraceicepsCoral-billed scimitar-babbler, Pomatorhinus ferruginosusSlender-billed scimitar-babbler, Pomatorhinus superciliarisStreak-breasted scimitar-babbler, Pomatorhinus ruficollisWhite-browed scimitar-babbler, Pomatorhinus schisticepsLarge scimitar-babbler, Erythrogenys hypoleucosBlack-streaked scimitar-babbler, Erythrogenys gravivox
Gray-throated babbler, Stachyris nigriceps
Spot-necked babbler, Stachyris striolata
Sooty babbler, Stachyris herberti

Ground babblers and allies
Order: PasseriformesFamily: Pellorneidae

These small to medium-sized songbirds have soft fluffy plumage but are otherwise rather diverse. Members of the genus Illadopsis are found in forests, but some other genera are birds of scrublands.

Scaly-crowned babbler, Malacopteron cinereum
Collared babbler, Gampsorhynchus torquatus
Yellow-throated fulvetta, Schoeniparus cinereus
Rufous-winged fulvetta, 	Schoeniparus castaneceps
Rufous-throated fulvetta, Schoeniparus rufogularis
Rusty-capped fulvetta, Schoeniparus dubius
Puff-throated babbler, Pellorneum ruficeps
Spot-throated babbler, Pellorneum albiventre
Buff-breasted babbler, Pellorneum tickelli
Eyebrowed wren-babbler, Napothera epilepidota
Short-tailed scimitar-babbler, Napothera danjoui
Abbott's babbler, Malacocincla abbotti
Annam limestone babbler, Gypsophila annamensis
Streaked wren-babbler, Gypsophila brevicaudatus

Laughingthrushes and allies
Order: PasseriformesFamily: Leiothrichidae

The members of this family are diverse in size and colouration, though those of genus Turdoides tend to be brown or greyish. The family is found in Africa, India, and southeast Asia.

Brown-cheeked fulvetta, Alcippe poioicephala
Yunnan fulvetta, Alcippe fratercula
Mountain fulvetta, Alcippe peracensis
Black-browed fulvetta, Alcippe grotei
Himalayan cutia, Cutia nipalensis
Vietnamese cutia, Cutia legalleni
White-crested laughingthrush, Garrulax leucolophus
Lesser necklaced laughingthrush, Garrulax monileger
White-necked laughingthrush, Garrulax strepitans
Black-hooded laughingthrush, Garrulax milleti
Rufous-cheeked laughingthrush, Garrulax castanotis
Spot-breasted laughingthrush, Garrulax merulinus
Chinese hwamei, Garrulax canorus (A)
Chestnut-eared laughingthrush, Ianthocincla konkakinhensis
Greater necklaced laughingthrush, Pterorhinus pectoralis
Black-throated laughingthrush, Pterorhinus chinensis
White-cheeked laughingthrush, Pterorhinus vassali
Rufous-vented laughingthrush, Pterorhinus gularis
White-browed laughingthrush, Pterorhinus sannio
Silver-eared laughingthrush, Trochalopteron melanostigma
Red-tailed laughingthrush, Trochalopteron milnei
Black-backed sibia, Heterophasia melanoleuca
Black-headed sibia, Heterophasia desgodinsi
Long-tailed sibia, Heterophasia picaoides
Silver-eared mesia, Leiothrix argentauris
Red-tailed minla, Minla ignotincta
Rufous-backed sibia, Leioptila annectens
Scarlet-faced liocichla, Liocichla ripponi
Black-crowned barwing, Actinodura sodangorum
Spectacled barwing, Actinodura ramsayi
Blue-winged minla, Actinodura cyanouroptera
Chestnut-tailed minla, Actinodura strigula

Nuthatches
Order: PasseriformesFamily: Sittidae

Nuthatches are small woodland birds. They have the unusual ability to climb down trees head first, unlike other birds which can only go upwards. Nuthatches have big heads, short tails and powerful bills and feet.

Chestnut-bellied nuthatch, Sitta castanea
Burmese nuthatch, Sitta neglecta
Chestnut-vented nuthatch, Sitta nagaensis
White-tailed nuthatch, Sitta himalayensis
Velvet-fronted nuthatch, Sitta frontalis
Yellow-billed nuthatch, Sitta solangiae
Beautiful nuthatch, Sitta formosa

Treecreepers
Order: PasseriformesFamily: Certhiidae

Treecreepers are small woodland birds, brown above and white below. They have thin pointed down-curved bills, which they use to extricate insects from bark. They have stiff tail feathers, like woodpeckers, which they use to support themselves on vertical trees.

Hume's treecreeper, Certhia manipurensis

Spotted elachura
Order: PasseriformesFamily: Elachuridae

This species, the only one in its family, inhabits forest undergrowth throughout South East Asia.

Spotted elachura, Elachura formosa

Dippers
Order: PasseriformesFamily: Cinclidae

Dippers are a group of perching birds whose habitat includes aquatic environments in the Americas, Europe and Asia. They are named for their bobbing or dipping movements.

Brown dipper, Cinclus pallasii

Starlings
Order: PasseriformesFamily: Sturnidae

Starlings are small to medium-sized passerine birds. Their flight is strong and direct and they are very gregarious. Their preferred habitat is fairly open country. They eat insects and fruit. Plumage is typically dark with a metallic sheen.

Golden-crested myna, Ampeliceps coronatus
Common hill myna, Gracula religiosa
European starling, Sturnus vulgaris (A)
Daurian starling, Agropsar sturninus (A)
Chestnut-cheeked starling, Agropsar philippensis (A)
Black-collared starling, Gracupica nigricollis
Siamese pied starling, Gracupica floweri
White-shouldered starling, Sturnia sinensis
Chestnut-tailed starling, Sturnia malabarica
Red-billed starling, Spodiopsar sericeus (A)
White-cheeked starling, Spodiopsar cineraceus (A)
Common myna, Acridotheres tristis
Vinous-breasted myna, Acridotheres leucocephalus
Great myna, Acridotheres grandis
Crested myna, Acridotheres cristatellus

Thrushes and allies
Order: PasseriformesFamily: Turdidae

The thrushes are a group of passerine birds that occur mainly in the Old World. They are plump, soft plumaged, small to medium-sized insectivores or sometimes omnivores, often feeding on the ground. Many have attractive songs.

Long-tailed thrush, Zoothera dixoni
Dark-sided thrush, Zoothera marginata
White's thrush, Zoothera aurea
Scaly thrush, Zoothera dauma
Purple cochoa, Cochoa purpurea (A)
Green cochoa, Cochoa viridis
Siberian thrush, Geokichla sibirica
Orange-headed thrush, Geokichla citrina
Chinese blackbird, Turdus mandarinus
Gray-winged blackbird, Turdus boulboul (A)
Japanese thrush, Turdus cardis
Gray-backed thrush, Turdus hortulorum (A)
Black-breasted thrush, Turdus dissimilis (A)
Gray-sided thrush, Turdus feae
Eyebrowed thrush, Turdus obscurus
Chestnut thrush, Turdus rubrocanus

Old World flycatchers
Order: PasseriformesFamily: Muscicapidae

Old World flycatchers are a large group of small passerine birds native to the Old World. They are mainly small arboreal insectivores. The appearance of these birds is highly varied, but they mostly have weak songs and harsh calls.

Dark-sided flycatcher, Muscicapa sibirica
Ferruginous flycatcher, Muscicapa ferruginea
Asian brown flycatcher, Muscicapa dauurica
Brown-breasted flycatcher, Muscicapa muttui (A)
Brown-streaked flycatcher, Muscicapa williamsoni (A)
Oriental magpie-robin, Copsychus saularis
White-rumped shama, Copsychus malabaricus
White-gorgeted flycatcher, Anthipes monileger
Rufous-browed flycatcher, Anthipes solitaris
White-tailed flycatcher, Cyornis concretus
Hainan blue flycatcher, Cyornis hainanus
Pale blue flycatcher, Cyornis unicolor
Blue-throated flycatcher, Cyornis rubeculoides (A)
Hill blue flycatcher, Cyornis whitei
Indochinese blue flycatcher, Cyornis sumatrensis
Brown-chested jungle-flycatcher, Cyornis sumatrensis (A)
Large niltava, Niltava grandis
Small niltava, Niltava macgrigoriae
Fujian niltava, Niltava davidi
Rufous-bellied niltava, Niltava sundara
Vivid niltava, Niltava vivida
Blue-and-white flycatcher, Cyanoptila cyanomelana
Zappey's flycatcher, Cyanoptila cumatilis
Verditer flycatcher, Eumyias thalassina
Lesser shortwing, Brachypteryx leucophrys
Himalayan shortwing, Brachypteryx cruralis
Rufous-tailed robin, Larvivora sibilans
Japanese robin, Larvivora akahige (A)
Siberian blue robin, Larvivora cyane
White-bellied redstart, Luscinia phaenicuroides
Bluethroat, Luscinia svecica
Blue whistling-thrush, Myophonus caeruleus
White-crowned forktail, Enicurus leschenaulti
Spotted forktail, Enicurus maculatus
Slaty-backed forktail, Enicurus schistaceus
Blackthroat, Calliope obscura
Siberian rubythroat, Calliope calliope
Chinese rubythroat, Calliope tschebaiewi (A)
White-tailed robin, Myiomela leucura
Blue-fronted robin, Cinclidium frontale
Red-flanked bluetail, Tarsiger cyanurus (A)
Himalayan bluetail, Tarsiger rufilatus
White-browed bush-robin, Tarsiger indicus (A)
Yellow-rumped flycatcher, Ficedula zanthopygia
Narcissus flycatcher, Ficedula narcissina (A)
Mugimaki flycatcher, Ficedula mugimaki
Slaty-backed flycatcher, Ficedula hodgsonii
Slaty-blue flycatcher, Ficedula tricolor
Snowy-browed flycatcher, Ficedula hyperythra
Pygmy flycatcher, Ficedula hodgsoni
Rufous-gorgeted flycatcher, Ficedula strophiata
Sapphire flycatcher, Ficedula sapphira
Little pied flycatcher, Ficedula westermanni
Taiga flycatcher, Ficedula albicilla
Blue-fronted redstart, Phoenicurus frontalis
Plumbeous redstart, Phoenicurus fuliginosus
White-capped redstart, Phoenicurus leucocephalus
Black redstart, Phoenicurus ochruros (A)
Daurian redstart, Phoenicurus auroreus
Chestnut-bellied rock-thrush, Monticola rufiventris
White-throated rock-thrush, Monticola gularis
Blue rock-thrush, Monticola solitarius
Siberian stonechat, Saxicola maurus
Amur stonechat, Saxicola stejnegeri
Pied bushchat, Saxicola caprata
Jerdon's bushchat, Saxicola jerdoni
Gray bushchat, Saxicola ferreus

Flowerpeckers
Order: PasseriformesFamily: Dicaeidae

The flowerpeckers are very small, stout, often brightly coloured birds, with short tails, short thick curved bills and tubular tongues.

Thick-billed flowerpecker, Dicaeum agile
Yellow-vented flowerpecker, Dicaeum chrysorrheum
Yellow-bellied flowerpecker, Dicaeum melanozanthum
Plain flowerpecker, Dicaeum minullum
Fire-breasted flowerpecker, Dicaeum ignipectus
Scarlet-backed flowerpecker, Dicaeum cruentatum

Sunbirds and spiderhunters
Order: PasseriformesFamily: Nectariniidae

The sunbirds and spiderhunters are very small passerine birds which feed largely on nectar, although they will also take insects, especially when feeding young. Flight is fast and direct on their short wings. Most species can take nectar by hovering like a hummingbird, but usually perch to feed.

Ruby-cheeked sunbird, Chalcoparia singalensis
Brown-throated sunbird, Anthreptes malacensis
Van Hasselt's sunbird, Leptocoma brasiliana
Purple sunbird, Cinnyris asiaticus
Olive-backed sunbird, Cinnyris jugularis
Black-throated sunbird, Aethopyga saturata
Mrs. Gould's sunbird, Aethopyga gouldiae
Green-tailed sunbird, Aethopyga nipalensis
Crimson sunbird, Aethopyga siparaja
Fork-tailed sunbird, Aethopyga christinae
Purple-naped spiderhunter, Kurochkinegramma hypogrammicum
Little spiderhunter, Arachnothera longirostra
Streaked spiderhunter, Arachnothera magna

Fairy-bluebirds
Order: PasseriformesFamily: Irenidae

The fairy-bluebirds are bulbul-like birds of open forest or thorn scrub. The males are dark-blue and the females a duller green.

Asian fairy-bluebird, Irena puella

Leafbirds
Order: PasseriformesFamily: Chloropseidae

The leafbirds are small, bulbul-like birds. The males are brightly plumaged, usually in greens and yellows.

Blue-winged leafbird, Chloropsis cochinchinensis
Golden-fronted leafbird, Chloropsis aurifrons
Orange-bellied leafbird, Chloropsis hardwickii

Weavers and allies
Order: PasseriformesFamily: Ploceidae

The weavers are small passerine birds related to the finches. They are seed-eating birds with rounded conical bills. The males of many species are brightly coloured, usually in red or yellow and black, some species show variation in colour only in the breeding season.

Streaked weaver, Ploceus manyar
Baya weaver, Ploceus philippinus (A)
Asian golden weaver, Ploceus hypoxanthus

Waxbills and allies
Order: PasseriformesFamily: Estrildidae

The estrildid finches are small passerine birds of the Old World tropics and Australasia. They are gregarious and often colonial seed eaters with short thick but pointed bills. They are all similar in structure and habits, but have wide variation in plumage colours and patterns.

Red avadavat, Amandava amandava (A)
Pin-tailed parrotfinch, Erythrura prasina
White-rumped munia, Lonchura striata
Scaly-breasted munia, Lonchura punctulata
Chestnut munia, Lonchura atricapilla

Old World sparrows
Order: PasseriformesFamily: Passeridae

Old World sparrows are small passerine birds. In general, sparrows tend to be small, plump, brown or grey birds with short tails and short powerful beaks. Sparrows are seed eaters, but they also consume small insects.

House sparrow, Passer domesticus (I)
Russet sparrow, Passer cinnamomeus
Plain-backed sparrow, Passer flaveolus
Eurasian tree sparrow, Passer montanus

Wagtails and pipits
Order: PasseriformesFamily: Motacillidae

Motacillidae is a family of small passerine birds with medium to long tails. They include the wagtails, longclaws and pipits. They are slender, ground feeding insectivores of open country.

Forest wagtail, Dendronanthus indicus
Gray wagtail, Motacilla cinerea
Western yellow wagtail, Motacilla flava (A)
Eastern yellow wagtail, Motacilla tschutschensis
Citrine wagtail, Motacilla citreola
Mekong wagtail, Motacilla samveasnae
White wagtail, Motacilla alba
Richard's pipit, Anthus richardi
Paddyfield pipit, Anthus rufulus
Blyth's pipit, Anthus godlewskii (A)
Rosy pipit, Anthus roseatus (A)
Olive-backed pipit, Anthus hodgsoni
Red-throated pipit, Anthus cervinus
American pipit, Anthus rubescens (A)

Finches, euphonias, and allies
Order: PasseriformesFamily: Fringillidae

Finches are seed-eating passerine birds, that are small to moderately large and have a strong beak, usually conical and in some species very large. All have twelve tail feathers and nine primaries. These birds have a bouncing flight with alternating bouts of flapping and gliding on closed wings, and most sing well.

Spot-winged grosbeak, Mycerobas melanozanthos
Yellow-billed grosbeak, Eophona migratoria (A)
Japanese grosbeak, Eophona personata (A)
Common rosefinch, Carpodacus erythrinus
Scarlet finch, Carpodacus sipahi
Black-headed greenfinch, Chloris ambigua (A)

Old World buntings
Order: PasseriformesFamily: Emberizidae

The emberizids are a large family of passerine birds. They are seed-eating birds with distinctively shaped bills. Many emberizid species have distinctive head patterns.

Crested bunting, Emberiza lathami
Black-headed bunting, Emberiza melanocephala (A)
Chestnut-eared bunting, Emberiza fucata
Yellow-breasted bunting, Emberiza aureola
Little bunting, Emberiza pusilla
Black-faced bunting, Emberiza spodocephala
Chestnut bunting, Emberiza rutila
Tristram's bunting, Emberiza tristrami (A)

See also
List of birds
Lists of birds by region

References

Laos
Laos
'
birds